Gholam Ali Haddad-Adel (born 9 May 1945) is an Iranian philosopher, conservative and principlist politician and former chairman of the Parliament. He is currently member of the Expediency Discernment Council.

He was the first non-cleric in the post since the Iranian Revolution of 1979. He was one of the candidates in the 2013 presidential election but withdrew on 10 June, four days before the election. He is part of "neo-principalist" group in the Iranian political scene.

Early life and education
Haddad-Adel was born in Tehran on 9 May 1945 into a business family. He received a bachelor's degree in physics from the University of Tehran and also, a master's degree in physics from University of Shiraz. He also holds a PhD in philosophy from the University of Tehran which he received in 1975.

He studied Islamic philosophy under Morteza Motahhari and also under Sayyed Hossein Nasr who is famous for his critique of Marxism.

Career
Following the Iranian Revolution Haddad-Adel became a member of the Islamic Republic Party and he served in many governmental posts, including deputy culture and Islamic guidance minister (1979) and deputy education minister (1982–1993). Since 1995 he has been serving as the head of the Iranian Academy of Persian Language and Literature (except for August 2004 – 2008). He is also the executive director of the Islamic Encyclopedia Foundation. He contributed to the establishment of the national Scientific Olympiads in Iran.

Haddad-Adel served at the Majlis for thirteen years, over four terms. He officially ranked as the 33rd candidate of Tehran in the 2000 parliamentary election after recounts by the Council of Guardians which led to an annulment of 700,000 Tehrani votes and the removal of Alireza Rajaei and Ali Akbar Rahmani from the top 30, and the withdrawal of Akbar Hashemi Rafsanjani. Haddad-Adel collected the most votes from Tehran four years later, while most Tehranis refused to vote in 2004 election because many reformist candidates where not allowed to run. He was supported by the Abadgaran alliance and became the Speaker of Parliament for one year beginning 6 June 2004, with 226 votes out of 259, running unopposed. He became the first non-clerical speaker since the revolution. Since 2008, he has been the advisor to the Supreme Leader Ali Khamenei. In 2012, he ran for the Majlis speakership, but lost the bid.

He is also a member of the High Council of Cultural Revolution and the Expediency Discernment Council.

Speaker of Parliament
As the speaker of Parliament, he condemned the bombing of Samarra. He added that Islamic countries must promote solidarity through guaranteeing unity and security against common enemies. He is the first senior Iranian parliamentary official to hold negotiations with both his counterpart in Cairo and President Mubarak after the Islamic revolution.

Presidential candidacy

Haddad-Adel run for office in the presidential election held in July 2013. He formed a coalition named 2+1 with Mohammad Bagher Ghalibaf and Ali Akbar Velayati in October 2012 to one of them be the coalition's candidate in the upcoming election. He was registered as a presidential candidate and was approved to run in the election by the Guardian Council, a vetting body of clerics and jurists, along with seven other men. 
He withdrew his candidacy from 14 June presidential election on 11 June. He said in a statement carried by the semi-official Mehr news agency:"With my withdrawal I ask the dear people to strictly observe the criteria of the Supreme Leader of the Revolution (Khamenei) when they vote for candidates."

He did not endorse a single candidate, but called for a hardline conservative victory. "I advise the dear people to take a correct decision so that either a conservative wins in the first round, or if the election runs to a second round, the competition between two conservatives."

President of Academy of Persian Language and Literature

Haddad-Adel is also the second president of the Academy of Persian Language and Literature. His presidency at the academy has focused on language policy and planning, and promotion of the Persian language in all domains.

Electoral history

Affiliation
Haddad-Adel is a senior member in the conservative umbrella organizations Alliance of Builders of Islamic Iran, as well as the Popular Front of Islamic Revolution Forces (JAMNA) and is considered close to the Society of Devotees of the Islamic Revolution and the Society of Pathseekers of the Islamic Revolution.

Public image
According to a poll conducted in March 2016 by Information and Public Opinion Solutions LLC (iPOS) among Iranian citizens, Haddad-Adel has 51% approval and 27% disapproval ratings and thus a +24% net popularity; while 13% of responders don't know him.

Views
One of Haddad-Adel's most significant views has been on the hijab in western civilization. According to him in the book of The Culture of Nakedness and the Nakedness of Culture, the issue of veiling and clothing in the West is problematic. He believes that materialism is the mentality which is governed by Western culture. The culture is based on the priority of material life, with no value in anything beyond materialism. The origin of materialism as a worldview is humanism, according to the renaissance. According to Haddad-Adel, religion serves an important role in Iranian education. Referring to the dominance of religious thought in education, he pointed out that religious education is one result of the victory of the Islamic revolution. He believes that the problem of human freedom is a permanent one. The problem itself has changed with the appearance of new theories in scientific and philosophic domains, particularly in the field of anthropology. He is also an admirer of the development of non-governmental higher education, and believes that developing such schools would lead to decreased demands on the administration of education and pedagogy.

Personal life
Haddad-Adel's daughter married Mojtaba Khamenei, the son of Ali Khamenei, Supreme Leader of Iran. This has led to the popular belief that he is among the most trusted and backed allies of Ayatollah Khamenei.

Publications
 Farhang-e Berahnegi va Berahnegi-e Farhangi (Culture of Nudity and Nudity of Culture), Soroush, Tehran, 1981, translated into Urdu, Arabic, and Turkish.
 Haj: Namaaz-e Bozorg (Hajj: the Grand Prayer), Sana, Tehran, 2000.
 Daaneshnaame-ye Jahaan-e Eslam (The Encyclopaedia of the world of Islam), Encyclopaedia Islamica Foundation, Volumes 2–6 (as supervisor), 1996–2001.
 Textbooks on sociology, social science, Civil studies and Qur'an, for high school and guidance schools.
 History & Histography, 2012 
 Tafsir: Qur'anic Exegesis, 2012 
 Hawza-Yi 'Ilmiyya Shi'I Teaching Institution: An Entry from Encyclopaedia of the World of Islam, 2012
 Law: Selected Entries from Encyclopaedia of the World of Islam - Encyclopaedia of the World of Islam (EWI), 2013 
 Historians of the Islamic World, 2018 (Editor) 
 Muslim Organisations in the Twentieth Century: Selected Entries from Encyclopaedia of the World of Islam, 2022 (Editor) 
 Historical Sources of the Islamic World: Selected Entries from Encyclopaedia of the World of Islam - Encyclopaedia of the World of Islam (EWI), 2013 
 Sufism: An Entry from Encyclopaedia of the World of Islam, 2013

Translations
 Tamhidaat: Moghaddame-i baraaye har Maa-ba'd-ot-tabi'e-ye Aayande ke be onvaan-e yek Elm Arze Shavad, a translation of Immanuel Kant's Prolegomena to any Future Metaphysics, Iran University Press, Tehran, 1988.
 Nazariye-ye Ma'refat dar Falsafe-ye Kaant, a translation of Justus Hartnack's Kant's Theory of Knowledge, Fekr-e Rooz, Tehran, 2000.
Translation of Quran
He translated Quran to Persian. The translation of the Quran by him lasted for 9 years. He tried to use all new and old translations and consult with other scholars of the Quran during the translation. The book has been exhibited in the nineteenth international fair of the Quran in Iran. He tried to pave the way for a more easy understanding of the Quran for all. The translation of Quran according to Hadad is based on the conceptual translation. He pointed out that since many Persian people could not read very well Arabic language then he undertake the task.

In 2019, he published a travelogue titled I Went to the Desert and Found a Downpour of Love. Haddad-Adel describes his personal memories and experiences during the 2017 Arbaeen trip in this book. Additionally, he provides a report on this spiritual journey, the emotions of those present at the annual ritual, and the mawkib keepers and organizers who host and assist those traveling to Imam Hussein's (AS) shrine in Karbala for the Arbaeen celebration.

Awards and recognition
 In 2019 the organizers of The 17th Golden Pen Awards honored Gholam-Ali Haddad-Adel as the Literary Figure of the Year.

References

External links

 News tag: Gholam-Ali Haddad-Adel, United Press International
 Video By Irannegah : Hadad Adel solution for correction of consumption style
 List of Gholam-Ali Haddad-Adel's publications
 Gholam-Ali Haddad-Adel's news tag at Tehran Times

1945 births
Living people
University of Tehran alumni
Speakers of the Islamic Consultative Assembly
Iranian Vice Ministers
Iranian writers
People from Tehran
Members of the Expediency Discernment Council
Members of the Academy of Persian Language and Literature
Candidates for President of Iran
Members of the 6th Islamic Consultative Assembly
Members of the 7th Islamic Consultative Assembly
Members of the 8th Islamic Consultative Assembly
Members of the 9th Islamic Consultative Assembly
Alliance of Builders of Islamic Iran politicians
Islamic Republican Party politicians
Popular Front of Islamic Revolution Forces politicians
Ali Khamenei
Iranian Science and Culture Hall of Fame recipients in Philosophy
Iran's Book of the Year Awards recipients
Faculty of Letters and Humanities of the University of Tehran alumni
Iranian individuals subject to the U.S. Department of the Treasury sanctions